Blanche Hillyard defeated Ruth Durlacher 7–5, 6–8, 6–1 in the All Comers' Final, and then defeated the reigning champion Charlotte Cooper 6–2, 6–3 in the challenge round to win the ladies' singles tennis title at the 1899 Wimbledon Championships.

Draw

Challenge round

All comers' finals

Top half

Bottom half

References

External links

Women's Singles
Wimbledon Championship by year – Women's singles
Wimbledon Championships - Singles
Wimbledon Championships - Singles